Novo is a rural locality (a village) in Ramenskoye Rural Settlement, Sheksninsky District, Vologda Oblast, Russia. The population was 2 as of 2002.

Geography 
Novo is located 46 km north of Sheksna (the district's administrative centre) by road. Aristovo is the nearest rural locality.

References 

Rural localities in Sheksninsky District